Corpus Christi Cathedral may refer to:
 Corpus Christi Cathedral, Tlalnepantla, Mexico
 Corpus Christi Cathedral (Port Harcourt), Nigeria
 Corpus Christi Cathedral (Corpus Christi, Texas), United States

See also 
 Corpus Christi Church (disambiguation)